A grindstone, also known as grinding stone, is a sharpening stone used for grinding or sharpening ferrous tools, used since ancient times. Tools are sharpened by the stone's abrasive qualities that remove material from the tool through friction in order to create a fine edge. Similar to sandpaper, each stone has a different grit that will result in sharper or duller tools. In Australia, Aboriginal peoples created grinding grooves by repeated shaping of stone axes against outcrops of sandstone.

History and description
Grindstones have been used since ancient times, to sharpen tools made of metal. They are usually made from sandstone.

Grinding grooves

Aboriginal grinding grooves, or axe-grinding grooves, have been found across the Australian continent. They are often found near water, which was sprinkled on the stone during grinding to reduce dust.

Machines

Grindstone machines work by spinning a circular piece of stone around its center point. These machines usually have pedals for speeding up and slowing down the stone to control the sharpening process. The earliest known representation of a rotary grindstone, operated by a crank handle, is found in the Carolingian manuscript known as the Utrecht Psalter. This pen drawing from about 830 goes back to a late antique original. The Luttrell Psalter, dating to around 1340, describes a grindstone rotated by two cranks, one at each end of its axle. Around 1480, the early medieval rotary grindstone was improved with a treadle and crank mechanism.

See also 
Lathe
Millstone
Punch (tool)
 Grindstone City Historic District

References

Sources 

Woodworking
Grinding and lapping
Knives